Menstruation in Islam relates to various purity related restrictions in Islamic jurisprudence. The ḥaiḍ (حيض menses) is the religious state of menstruation in Islam.  The Qur'an makes specific mention of menstruation in Quran 2:222 which instructs:

And they ask you about menstruation. Say, "It is harm, so keep away from wives during menstruation. And do not approach them until they are pure. And when they have purified themselves, then come to them from where Allāh has ordained for you. Indeed, Allāh loves those who are constantly repentant and loves those who purify themselves.

The language is taken to clearly imply that sexual relations during menstruation are prohibited. Ibn Kathīr, a muhaddith, narrated a hadith that describes Muhammad's habits with his menstruating wives. This hadith demonstrates that Muhammad gave licence to all forms of spousal intimacy during the period of menstruation with the exception of intercourse. Women are required to perform ritual cleansing (ghusl) before resuming religious duties or relations upon completion of their menstruation.

intercourse is also prohibited during menstruation, for forty days after childbirth (puerperium), during the daylight hours of the month of Ramadan (i.e. while fasting) and on pilgrimage. While in the sanctuary (in Ahram) at Mecca, pilgrims are not allowed to have intercourse, and marriages performed during the pilgrimage are invalid.

Muslim women that are going through menstrual bleeding are exempt from fasting during the Ramadan according to the Hadiths, but have to make them up after menstruation. This was found by hadiths preventing many women from praying during their menses. 

It is not permissible for a man to have intercourse with menstruating wife. This is written in verse 2:222 of the Quran

Verse 2:222 in the Quran implies that relations during menstruation are prohibited. But it does not mention forbidding prayers, however it is mentioned in the hadith which states that women should not pray during menstruation and that they don't have to make up for the missed prayers during this period. God requires prayer to help people stay on the good path away from bad deeds. Despite the verse saying “to segregate the women” and “not go near them,” various hadith indicate that Muhammad considered this to refer only to sexual intercourse. Hadiths are not considered as reliable as the Quran, but there are various references of Muhammad having said that the verse mentioned above means only intercourse and of Muhammad interacting with his wives while they were on their menses. One hadith mentions that Muhammad would lie on his wife Ayesha's lap and recite the Qur'an when she was on her menses. All these hadiths are classified as being sahih, which means they can be trusted.

It is prohibited for a man to divorce a menstruating woman during her menses. Women are supposed to maintain proper hygiene and should not perform prayer. They do not have to make up the prayers they missed during menstruation. When the menstruating period is over, women have to perform  ritual purification (ghusl).

See also
 Culture and menstruation
 Divorce in Islam
 Iddah
 Women's prayer in Islam

References

Islamic jurisprudence
Islam and women
Menstrual cycle